Jay Byrne (born 1962) is an American writer, former senior government official and entrepreneur. Byrne is president and founder of v-Fluence Interactive, an online market research and software development firm.   He is a frequent public speaker on the use of the Internet and has published  several articles on new media and communications.  He is a contributing author to “Let Them Eat Precaution” published by the American Enterprise Institute.

Career
As former political campaign operative Byrne is credited with executing a range of aggressive communications tactics, including the 1992 presidential campaign's Chicken George (politics) attack on George H. W. Bush. Byrne was Deputy Assistant Administrator for Legislative and Public Affairs at the U.S. Agency for International Development (USAID) in the Clinton Administration from 1993 to 1997.
During this time he also served as a White House spokesperson for numerous presidential and administration foreign policy initiatives including the 1994 G7 Jobs Summit and the Greater Horn of Africa Famine Initiative. Prior to joining USAID Byrne held  communication positions on the Clinton-Gore presidential campaign, for Boston Mayor Raymond Flynn and for Congressman Joseph Patrick Kennedy II (D-MA). After serving in the Clinton Administration, Byrne headed up corporate communications for Monsanto Company from 1997 to 2001. Born in Boston, Massachusetts) Byrne attended St. John's Preparatory School and graduated from Tufts University.

Books

Other publications

References

External links
 v-Fluence Company Biography of Jay Byrne
 Let Them Eat Precaution by Jay Byrne, et al., published by AEI
 Talkers Magazine New Media Seminar with Jay Byrne

Living people
1962 births
Tufts University alumni